Louisa Jane Gurski (née Sawers, born 26 May 1988) is a London 2012 Olympic Games finalist who competes in Sprint Kayaker for Great Britain. She was brought up in Walton-on-Thames and started Kayaking at Elmbridge Canoe Club, Weybridge at the age of 10.

International results
Early success saw her win the 2006 World Junior Marathon Championships in both K1 and K2 events with Jessica Walker. She then moved to Marlow, Buckinghamshire to train with the Great Britain Kayaking team at Dorney Lake and Bisham Abbey.

2009
2009 was a breakthrough year in the Senior sprint events for Louisa where she won a Bronze Medal at the 2009 Canoe Sprint European Championships in the K4 200m, 5th in the K4 500m at the same event. Another 5th at the 2009 ICF Canoe Sprint World Championships in Dartmouth, Canada confirmed the results were not a fluke. She finished the year with a Silver at the Under 23 Canoe Marathon World Championships in Gaia, Portugal.

2010
A solid year for Louisa in the Sprint event where she came 9th (K2 500m) at the 2010 Canoe Sprint European Championships in Trasona, Spain and then another 5th (k4 500m) at the 2010 ICF Canoe Sprint World Championships, gaining time on the medal positions.

2011
Remaining in the GB Women's K4 500m event throughout the year, Louisa was 6th at the 2011 Canoe Sprint European Championships in Belgrade, Serbia and this was followed by a 4th and Olympic qualification at the 2011 ICF Canoe Sprint World Championships in Szeged, Hungary.

2012
Louisa started the season at the 2012 Canoe Sprint European Championships in Zagreb, Croatia, with a 4th in the Women's K4 500m event. At the London Olympics 2012 in August she came 5th in the Women's K4 500m final, competing with Rachel Cawthorn, Jess Walker and Angela Hannah.  She came 11th in the K2 500m event with Abigail Edmonds.

2014

Sawers won the K-1 5000 m at the 2014 World Championships.

2016

Competing as Louisa Gurski, she was part of the Great Britain women's K-4 500 m team finished 7th along with Jess Walker, Rachel Cawthorn and Rebii Simon.

Support and sponsors
She is supported by the UK Sport Olympic Podium Programme and sponsored by Sweaty Betty, Shock Absorber and Tesco.

References

External links

1988 births
English female canoeists
Living people
Canoeists at the 2012 Summer Olympics
Canoeists at the 2016 Summer Olympics
Olympic canoeists of Great Britain
People from Surrey
British female canoeists
Canoeists at the 2015 European Games
European Games competitors for Great Britain
Sportspeople from Chertsey